Mott High School or Waterford Mott High School is a public high school in the Waterford School District located in Waterford, Michigan. The official name of the high school is Charles S. Mott High School, named for the automotive industry pioneer.

History

Waterford Mott High School was established in 1967, with the first graduating class in June 1970.

In 1983, the school district consolidated high schools and closed Waterford Township High School. This left two high schools in the district; Mott and Waterford Kettering High School.

In the fall of 1990, ninth graders joined the Mott student body.

As of the 2018–2019 school year, its enrollment was 1,559 students in grades nine through twelve.

Students are offered a variety of classes in all four core areas as well as art, business, computer science, engineering, foreign language, health occupations, music, physical education, technology, theater, and video production.

Extracurricular activities

Waterford Mott hosts a variety of clubs and programs including: the Anti-Defamation League, Bible Club, Board Game Club, Chess Club, DECA Marketing Club, Destination Imagination, Drama Club, International Thespian Society (ITS), Gay/Straight Alliance, Hazards of Tobacco (HOT), Link Crew, National Art Honor Society, National Technical Honor Society National Honor Society (NHS), Positive Peer Influence (PPI), Quiz Bowl, Students Against Destructive Decisions (SADD), Student Council, Student Leadership, Robotics, and Freestyle Walking.

Waterford Mott also offers thirty-two different sports to both boys and girls students. The Corsairs compete in the Kensington Lakes Activities Association and are members of the Michigan High School Athletic Association.

Notable alumni
 Mary Barra (1980), CEO, General Motors
 Brett Reed (1990), men's basketball head coach, Lehigh University
 Kristopher Pooley (1994), rock musician, music director
 Todd Alsup (1996), pianist, singer-songwriter
 Jean (Racine) Prahm (1996), U.S. Olympic bobsledder
 Andy Thorn (2000), former NFL player
 Dylan Larkin (2013), NHL player for the Detroit Red Wings
 Dez Fitzpatrick (2016), NFL player for the Tennessee Titans
 Isaiah Jackson (2020), NBA player for the Indiana Pacers

References

External links
Waterford Mott High School

Public high schools in Michigan
Educational institutions established in 1969
High schools in Oakland County, Michigan
Schools in Waterford Township, Michigan
1969 establishments in Michigan